Iwona Wszołkówna (Iwona Wszołek) (born April 13, 1975) is a Polish film and theater actress.

Biography 
In 2000, she graduated from the AST National Academy of Theatre Arts in Kraków. In the same year, she started working at the Współczesny Theater in Warsaw. Married to the director Jerzy Bogajewicz, has two children: son Antoni (born 2005) and daughter Tina (born 2007).

Filmography 
 2003: Kasia i Tomek – Regina
 2003: Zaginiona
 2004: Camera Café – Asia
 2004: Kryminalni – waitress Lucyna
 2004: The Wedding (Polish: Wesele) – Januszewska, senior bridesmaid
 2005: Anioł Stróż – Kamila
 2005: Boża podszewka II – Frida
 2005–2009: Niania – Jola, an employee of Jarosiński's wedding dress salon, a friend of Frania
 2006: Ale się kręci
 2006: Just Love Me (Polish: Tylko mnie kochaj) – neighbor Julii
 2006: 39 i pół – Macińska
 2011: Wszyscy kochają Romana – Ola, a friend Doroty
 2011: Pokaż kotku, co masz w środku – Janina Zientara, wife of the policeman Zygmunt
 2014: The Mighty Angel (Polish: Pod mocnym aniołem) – alcoholic Joanna
 2015: True Law (Polish: Prawo Agaty) – Jola Kruk

References 

Living people
1975 births
Polish film actresses
Polish stage actresses
People from Warsaw